Interpretability logics comprise a family of modal logics that extend  provability logic to describe interpretability or various related metamathematical properties and relations such as weak interpretability, Π1-conservativity, cointerpretability, tolerance, cotolerance, and arithmetic complexities. 

Main contributors to the field are Alessandro Berarducci, Petr Hájek, Konstantin Ignatiev, Giorgi Japaridze, Franco Montagna, Vladimir Shavrukov, Rineke Verbrugge, Albert Visser, and Domenico Zambella.

Examples

Logic ILM 

The language of ILM extends that of classical propositional logic by adding the unary modal operator  and the binary modal operator  (as always,  is defined as ).

Axiom schemata: 

1. All classical tautologies

2. 

3. 

4. 

5. 

6. 

7. 

8. 

9. 

Rules of inference: 

1. “From  and  conclude ” 

2. “From  conclude ”.

The completeness of ILM with respect to its arithmetical interpretation was independently proven by Alessandro Berarducci and Vladimir Shavrukov.

Logic TOL 

The language of TOL extends that of classical propositional logic by adding the modal operator  which is allowed to take any nonempty sequence of arguments.
 
Axioms (with  standing for any formulas,   for any sequences of formulas, and  identified with ⊤): 

1. All classical tautologies

2. 

3. 

4. 

5. 

6. 

7. 

Rules of inference: 

1. “From  and  conclude ” 

2. “From  conclude ”.

The completeness of TOL with respect to its arithmetical interpretation was proven by Giorgi Japaridze.

References
 Giorgi Japaridze and Dick de Jongh, The Logic of Provability. In Handbook of Proof Theory, S. Buss, ed., Elsevier, 1998, pp. 475-546.

Modal logic
Provability logic